Einar Kristinn Guðfinnsson (born 2 December 1955) is an Icelandic politician. He was speaker of the Althing, in office 2013 until 2016. He was Iceland's Minister of Fisheries from September 2005, and became Minister of Fisheries and Agriculture when the two ministries merged on 1 January 2008 until 1 February 2009.

References

External links 
 Members of Parliament > The Speaker and Deputy Speakers of Althingi > Einar K. Guðfinnsson, Speaker of Althingi (Icelandic)

Einar Kristinn Gudfinnsson
Einar Kristinn Gudfinnsson
Einar Kristinn Gudfinnsson
Einar Kristinn Gudfinnsson
1955 births
Living people
Einar Kristinn Gudfinnsson